Narcotica is a genus of moths of the family Noctuidae. The genus was erected by Shigero Sugi in 1982.

Species
Narcotica cryptica Kiss, Choi & Han, 2018 South Korea, China (Zhejiang, Jiangxi, Shanxi)
Narcotica hoenei Kiss, Choi & Han, 2018 China (Shanghai, Zhejiang, Shaanxi, Sichuan)
Narcotica niveosparsa (Matsumura, 1926) Japan, Korea, south-eastern China

References

Acronictinae